"Cross of Gold" is a 1965 Australian television film which aired on ABC. It is based on the 1833 novel Eugénie Grandet by Honoré de Balzac. It was produced in ABC's Melbourne studios. It aired in a 75-minute time-slot. Per a search of their website, the National Archives may hold a copy, with running time listed as 1:14:33.

Plot
Eugenei Grandet, daughter of a miserly financier, lends her cousin Charles 8,000 francs in gold which her father has given her as gifts over the years. Charles is to return to marry her but when he does he is a social climbing snob who has married another woman. Eugenie has the gold turned into a cross made of gold.

Cast
Allen Bickford as Charles Grandet
Fay Kelton as Eugenie
Raymond Westwell as Pete Grandet
Christine Calcutt 
Penelope Shelton 
Kevin Colebrook as Cruchot
Dennis Clinton 
Kenric Hudson

Differences from the novel
In the novel, Eugenie spent her fortune on charity. In this version she became a miser.

Reception
The Age called it "a complete success - a uniform, high quality cast, a first class play and imaginative, competent directing."

Radio adaptation
A radio adaptation of the film was made for ABC. The script was again written by Lane.

References

External links
 
 Cross of Gold at Austlit

1965 television plays
1965 Australian television episodes
1960s Australian television plays
Black-and-white television episodes
Wednesday Theatre (season 1) episodes